Tobón is a family name in Medellín, Colombia. Notable people with the name include:

Laura Tobón (born 1990), Colombian presenter
Miguel Tobón (born 1968) Colombian tennis player
 (1882–1954) Colombian businessman
 (born 1951), archbishop of Medellín

See also
Pablo Tobón Uribe Hospital in Medellín, Colombia
 , a theatre in Medellín
Postobón, soft drink company founded 1904 Medellín, Colombia by Gabriel Posada and Valerio Tobón (whose names combine to form the name)

Spanish-language surnames